This article contains a list of chairmen, administrators, commissioners and governors of British Kenya Colony.

The office of Governor of Kenya was replaced by the office of Governor General in 1963 and then later replaced by a President of Kenya, upon Kenya becoming a Republic in 1964. For continuation after independence, see: List of heads of state of Kenya.

Chairmen/Administrators of the Imperial British East Africa Company

Commissioners and Governors of the East Africa Protectorate/Kenya

See also 
 Kenya
 List of heads of state of Kenya
 Prime Minister of Kenya
 Deputy President of Kenya
 Lists of office-holders

References 

Colonial governors and administrators
Colonial governors and administrators
Colonial governors and administrators, Kenya
 
Kenya
Colonial governors and administrators
Kenya and the Commonwealth of Nations